Dragonfire II: The Dungeonmaster's Assistant is a computer program published by Magicware for Apple, Commodore and IBM Personal Computers in 1985. The program, and its predecessor, were designed by Erik Brynjolfsson, who is now an MIT professor. Dragonfire II was written by Steven Bergstein, who worked for Magicware and Brynjolfsson at the time.

Use
The program is designed to assist a game master in managing table-top role-playing games such as Dungeons & Dragons and Tunnels & Trolls. A user can enter material into the menu-driven program's tables, including random monster appearances, treasure tables, battle elements, and the creation of new monsters and characters. The software allowed users to customize templates, permitting them to modify the system so that it would generate characters, encounters and other game requirements for a multiple role playing systems.

Ed Curtis reviewed the program for Computer Gaming World, and stated that "
."

Reception
The software was reviewed in 1986 in Dragon #116 by Hartley and Pattie Lesser in "The Role of Computers" column. The reviewers concluded that "This program is highly recommended to all." Another 1986 review, in Computer Gaming World #33, praised the software's utility, and described it as being the most flexible and thorough of the products that were available on the market at the time.

See also
 List of role-playing game software

References

1985 video games
Role-playing game software
Video games developed in the United States